"The Finer Things" is a 1987 song written and performed by Steve Winwood. It was released as the fourth single from Winwood's 1986 album Back in the High Life. It went to number one for three weeks on the Adult Contemporary chart in 1987 and peaked at number eight on the Billboard Hot 100.

Track listing 

7": Island / 7-28498 United States
 "The Finer Things" - 4:00
 "Night Train" (Instrumental) - 4:10

12": Island / 608 876 Europe
 "The Finer Things" - 8:25
 "The Finer Things" (Instrumental) - 4:35

Personnel 
 Steve Winwood – lead vocals, keyboards, synth solo, drum machine programming, sequencer programming
 Robbie Kilgore – additional keyboards, synthesizer and sequencer programming
 Rob Mounsey – additional keyboards
 Andrew Thomas – PPG Waveterm synthesizer programming
 Paul Pesco – guitar
 Jimmy Bralower – additional drum machine programming
 John Robinson – drums
 Carole Steele – congas
 James Ingram – backing vocals
 Dan Hartman – backing vocals

Charts

References

External links
 

1986 songs
1987 singles
Steve Winwood songs
Songs written by Steve Winwood
Songs with lyrics by Will Jennings
Island Records singles